Satya Krishnan is an Indian actress who predominantly appears in Telugu films. She was born in Hyderabad, Telangana, India. She worked as a hotel management professional and entered the film industry with the film Dollar Dreams. Mostly starring in supporting roles, she is probably best known for her performance as Anitha in the 2004 Sekhar Kammula-directed Telugu film Anand.

Career 
Satya Krishnan is from Hyderabad where she completed her education. She did a course in Hotel Management and worked at Taj group of hotels in her home town. She wanted to be an air hostess.

She entered the film industry in 2000 with the film Dollar Dreams directed by Sekhar Kammula. Later she got married and took up a job at BNP Paribas Bank in Punjagutta. After four years, Sekhar Kammula again approached her with a role in his film Anand. She quit her job and began working full-time as an actress. She said that her character in Anand is very close to her real life character. She won a Nandi Award for her role in the film.

She has also been seen in other movies including the superhit Bommarillu, Premante Inte, Venkat Kuchipudi's Modati Cinema, Ullasamga Utsahamga and Vinayakudu. She played a lead role for the first time in her career in Mental Krishna but the film was not well received. In its review for the film Lovely, The Hindu wrote: "Satya Krishna ... gets some of the best lines in the film and we wish her role was better etched out. She runs the risk of being typecast in firebrand kind of roles though".

In 2020, she appeared in the sitcom web series Amrutham Dhvitheeyam, which is the third installment in the Amrutham franchise.

Filmography

Films 
All films are in Telugu, unless otherwise noted.

Television

Accolades
 Won: Nandi Award for Best Supporting Actress - Anand

References

External links 
 

Actresses in Telugu cinema
Living people
Nandi Award winners
Actresses in Tamil cinema
Indian film actresses
21st-century Indian actresses
Actresses from Hyderabad, India
Actresses in Urdu cinema
Year of birth missing (living people)